Battle of the Brains is a quizbowl show in the Richmond and Hampton Roads areas of Virginia. It currently airs on WTVR in the Richmond area, and WTKR in Hampton Roads. The current show began in Richmond in 1975, and it originally aired on a local PBS member station until it was canceled by the station. Its 2002–2003 season was aired on a public-access television cable TV station, before the Richmond CBS affiliate added the show, where it currently airs on Saturday mornings at 10:00 A.M. The Hampton Roads program began with the 2004-2005 season, formerly airing on WAVY-TV. As of the 2017-18 season, it airs on WTKR at 11:00 A.M.  

Since the early 2000s, the team to beat in the competition has been the Maggie L. Walker Governor's School  in Richmond, although the 2012 champion was Charlottesville High School. Ocean Lakes High School of Virginia Beach is the reigning Hampton Roads area champion.

The show currently matches the Richmond-area winner against the Hampton Roads-area winner in a game called the “Champion’s Challenge”. Charlottesville High School is the reigning champion. Also, the 2003-2004 season marked the first time an All-Star game was held from the top individual players representing themselves. The first All-Star game featured eight players from seven different schools, while the second game had eight from six schools.

Beginning with the 2007-2008 season, high schools from Northeastern North Carolina were allowed to compete in the Hampton Roads show.

The show is hosted by WTVR's Cheryl Miller.  The Hampton Roads show was hosted by WAVY's Stephanie Harris when it aired on that station. Since the move to WTKR, the Richmond version airs in both markets.

Regional Competition Rules

General Rules

Schools may only pre-test once per year.
Schools must pre-test and compete in the TV viewing area that covers the school.
Schools outside of a TV viewing area will compete in the region closest to their school.
The Central Virginia champion will meet the Southeast Virginia champion in a Championship Game.
The Championship Game will be broadcast on both Central Virginia and Southeast Virginia TV stations

Tournament Rules

General Rules

There will be two Toss-Up Rounds and a Category Round.
If the match ends in a tie, a sudden-death tiebreaker question will be asked. If a student buzzes early with an incorrect answer, the team will be penalized 5 points and the match will be over.
The decisions of the Battle of the Brains judges in the studio are final and cannot be appealed.

Toss-Up Rounds

Each correct answer is worth 10 points. If a student buzzes early with a correct answer, the host will acknowledge the answer and then summarize the reading of the question for the viewing audience.
Answers must be given within a 5-second interval.
There is no collaboration among team members during this round.
A student may buzz before the host has completed the question. However, the host will immediately stop reading the question and go to that student for an answer. If the student answers incorrectly, his/her team will be penalized 5 points. The host will then complete the question. Any member of the opposing team may attempt to answer. There is no penalty should the opposing team stop the host before the question is completed. This is the only situation, other than the category rounds, in which no penalty will be assessed for an incorrect answer given before completion of a question.
Should the Toss-Up Round end in the middle of a question, the question will be eliminated. If the round ends in the middle of an answer, the student will be allowed to complete the answer (within the 5-second limit). If the answer is incorrect, the opposing team will NOT have an opportunity to respond.
There is no penalty for an incorrect answer after the host has completed the reading of a question.
The host will provide the correct answer for the audience should neither team provide an accepted response. A new toss-up question will then be read.

Category Round

Teams will be shown five unique categories. Examples of these: (1) 19th Century American Vice Presidents, (2) Italian Operas, or (3) Math Formulas.
Each category has a total of 10 questions, each worth 5 points.
A team that correctly answers all ten items in a category will be awarded 20 bonus points.
A total of one minute per category is allowed. Collaboration is allowed. However, answers are accepted only from the team captain. Teams may pass items, given the time limit. There is no penalty for incorrect answers. The opposing team cannot respond to unanswered items or incorrect responses.
The team that has the lead will have the first choice of categories. Approximately 15 seconds is allotted to make the choice.
Following the completion of the first category chosen, the opposing team will select the second and third category in the round.
After the second team has completed its categories, the first team will select its second and last category. (One category will be unused.)

All Star Rules

General Rules

The “All-Stars” features 8 individual players.
Each player competes during 2 Toss-Up rounds and a Category Round.
The decisions of the Battle of the Brains judges in the studio are final and cannot be appealed.

Toss-Up Rounds

Toss-Up questions are worth 10 points each.
Toss-Up questions interrupted with an incorrect answer before being completed incur a 5-point penalty and the question completed for the opposition.
There is no penalty for incorrect answers to completed questions.
After 3 incorrect answers, the correct answer is given.

Category Round

There are 16 categories in the Category Round.
Each specific category is revealed as the flashing categories stop.
Players may select that category or pass to request an alternate category.
If an alternate category is requested, the player must take the 2nd selection.
Each category contains 6 questions worth 5 points.
Players have 30 seconds for each category.
Players may pass a question and if time remains, the question will be repeated.
There is no penalty for incorrect answers.
If all 6 questions are answered correctly, there will be a 10 point bonus.

Sudden Death Round

A “sudden death” round will occur if 2 or more players are tied at the end of the game.
The first player answering correctly is declared the winner.
No penalty occurs for early ring-ins and incorrect answers during “sudden death”.

Champions

Richmond-area champions
1982- Collegiate School
1984- St. Christopher's School
1985- St. Christopher's School
1986- Stafford High School
1987- Thomas Dale High School
1988- Meadowbrook High School
1989- Douglas S. Freeman High School
1990- Collegiate School
1991- Collegiate School
1992- Douglas Freeman High School
1993- Governor's School
1994- Governor's School
1995- Governor's School
1996- Governor's School
1997- St. Christopher's School
1998- St. Christopher's School
1999- Governor's School
2000- Governor's School
2001- Collegiate School
2002- Maggie Walker Governor's School
2003- Blessed Sacrament-Huguenot
2004- Maggie Walker Governor's School
2005- Charlottesville High School
2006- Maggie Walker Governor's School
2007- Maggie Walker Governor's School
2008- Maggie Walker Governor's School
2009- Maggie Walker Governor's School
2010- Maggie Walker Governor's School
2011- Maggie Walker Governor's School
2012- Charlottesville High School

Hampton Roads champions
2005- Kecoughtan High School
2006- Ocean Lakes High School
2007- Ocean Lakes High School
2008- Hickory High School
2009- Ocean Lakes High School

Champion's Challenge winners
2005- Charlottesville High School
2006- Maggie Walker Governor's School
2007- Maggie Walker Governor's School
2008- Maggie Walker Governor's School
2009- Maggie Walker Governor's School

External links
Official Battle of the Brains Website

Student quiz television series
Mass media in Richmond, Virginia
American public access television shows